Kyrylo Davydov (born 6 November 1988) is a Ukrainian football defender who played for SC Tavriya Simferopol in the Ukrainian Premier League.

Davydov began his playing career with SC Tavriya Simferopol's youth team. He made his first team debut in the Premier League match against FC Illychivets Mariupol on 15 November 2008, but was substituted in first time.

International career 
He made his debut in the Ukraine national under-21 football team in a match against Netherlands-21 on 10 October 2008.

References

External links 
Profile at Official Site FFU (Ukr)

Ukrainian footballers
SC Tavriya Simferopol players
1988 births
Living people
Association football midfielders